Mr. Todd's Experiment is a 1920 comedy play by the British-American writer Walter C. Hackett.

It ran for 67 performances at the Queen's Theatre in London's West End. The original cast included Owen Nares, Fred Kerr, Meggie Albanesi, Doris Lloyd, Marion Lorne, E. Holman Clark and Tom Reynolds.

References

Bibliography

 Wearing, J.P. The London Stage 1920–1929: A Calendar of Productions, Performers, and Personnel. Rowman & Littlefield, 2014.

1920 plays
West End plays
Comedy plays
Plays by Walter C. Hackett